The Paris Concert is a 1978 live album by Oscar Peterson accompanied by bassist Niels-Henning Ørsted Pedersen and guitarist Joe Pass.

Reception

Writing for Allmusic, music critic Scott Yanow wrote of the CD reissue "[Peterson] mostly sticks to standards but includes three songs associated with Benny Goodman (including the riff-filled 'Benny's Bugle'), features Pass (who contributed his original 'Gentle Tears') unaccompanied on 'Lover Man' and really romps with his fellow virtuosoes on such numbers as 'Ornithology,' 'Donna Lee' and 'Sweet Georgia Brown.'"

Track listing
 "Please Don't Talk About Me When I'm Gone" (Sidney Clare, Sam H. Stept) – 6:54
 "Who Can I Turn To?" (Leslie Bricusse, Anthony Newley) – 8:09
 "Benny's Bugle" (Benny Goodman) – 6:09
 "Soft Winds" (Goodman, Fletcher Henderson) – 8:26
 "Goodbye" (Gordon Jenkins) – 6:19
 "Place St. Henri" (Oscar Peterson) – 5:01
 Medley: "Manhã de Carnaval"/"If" (Luiz Bonfá)/(David Gates) – 9:33
 "Ornithology" (Benny Harris, Charlie Parker) – 4:46
 "Blue Lou" (Irving Mills, Edgar Sampson) – 3:28
 "How Long Has This Been Going On?" (George Gershwin, Ira Gershwin) – 5:10
 "Gentle Tears" (Joe Pass) – 6:33
 "Lover Man (Oh Where Can You Be?)" (Jimmy Davis, Roger ("Ram") Ramirez, James Sherman) – 5:04
 "Samba de Orfeu" (Bonfá, Antônio Maria) – 4:36
 "Donna Lee" (Charlie Parker) – 2:45
 "Sweet Georgia Brown" (Ben Bernie, Kenneth Casey, Maceo Pinkard) – 6:24

Personnel

Performance
 Oscar Peterson – piano
 Joe Pass – guitar
 Niels-Henning Ørsted Pedersen – double bass

References

Oscar Peterson live albums
Albums produced by Norman Granz
1978 live albums
Pablo Records live albums